The Society for Neuroscience (SfN) is a professional society, headquartered in Washington, D.C., for basic scientists and physicians around the world whose research is focused on the study of the brain and nervous system. It is especially well known for its annual meeting, consistently one of the largest scientific conferences in the world.

History 
SfN was founded in 1969 by Ralph W. Gerard and, at nearly 37,000 members, has grown to be the largest neuroscience society in the world. The stated mission of the society is to:
Advance the understanding of the brain and the nervous system.
Provide professional development activities, information, and educational resources.
Promote public information and general education about science and neuroscience.
Inform legislators and other policy makers about the implications of research for public policy, societal benefit, and continued scientific progress.

Annual meeting 
The Society holds an annual meeting that is attended by scientists and physicians from all around the world. The first annual meeting of the society was held in Washington, DC in 1971, and it was attended by 1,396 scientists. Subsequent meetings have been held annually in a variety of cities throughout the US, with the exception of the 1988 meeting, which was held in Canada.The 2018 meeting was held in San Diego, CA, and the 2019 meeting was held in Chicago, IL.

Publishing 
The Journal of Neuroscience, was launched in 1981 and has consistently been a multidisciplinary journal publishing papers on a broad range of topics of general interest to those working on the nervous-system. In addition, SfN publications offer breadth and depth into the rapidly developing field of neuroscience.

eNeuro, was launched in 2014, SfN's open-access journal publishes high quality papers in all areas of neuroscience that increase the understanding of the nervous-system, including replication studies and negative results.

SfN's digital member magazine, Neuroscience Quarterly covers SfN news, programs, science, and events, and other neuroscience-related issues. Enhanced content includes videos, slideshows, and interactive elements.

Nexus is a digital newsletter, containing key dates and details for annual meeting attendees, the latest research for JNeurosci and eNeuro, and public education and advocacy initiatives.

Presidents 

The following people have been President of the Society:

Awards 
SfN offers the following awards, fellowships, and honors:
Award for Education in Neuroscience
Bernice Grafstein Award for Outstanding Accomplishments in Mentoring
Donald B. Lindsley Prize in Behavioral Neuroscience
FENS Forum Travel Awards
FENS Member Travel Awards to SfN Annual Meeting
The Gruber Foundation Neuroscience Prize
IBRO Member Travel Awards to SfN Annual Meeting
IBRO World Congress Travel Awards
Jacob P. Waletzky Award
Janett Rosenberg Trubatch Career Development Award
JNS Meeting Travel Awards
JNS Member Travel Awards to SfN Annual Meeting
Julius Axelrod Prize
Louise Hanson Marshall Special Recognition Award
Mika Salpeter Lifetime Achievement Award
Nemko Prize in Cellular or Molecular Neuroscience
Neuroscience Scholars Program
Next Generation Award
Patricia Goldman-Rakic Hall of Honor
Peter and Patricia Gruber International Research Award
Ralph W. Gerard Prize in Neuroscience
Science Educator Award
Science Journalism Student Award
Swartz Prize for Theoretical and Computational Neuroscience
Trainee Professional Development Awards
Young Investigator Award

References

External links
 

Neuroscience organizations
Scientific societies based in the United States
1969 establishments in Washington, D.C.
Organizations established in 1969